The Cayman Islands women's national football team is the national women's football team of the Cayman Islands and is overseen by the Cayman Islands Football Association.

Results and fixtures

The following is a list of match results in the last 12 months, as well as any future matches that have been scheduled.

Legend

2022

Coaching staff

Managerial history

 Ruben Flores (2014–2021)
 Chandler González (2021–)

Players

Current squad
These players were called up for the 2022 CONCACAF W Championship qualification.

Competitive record

FIFA Women's World Cup

*Draws include knockout matches decided on penalty kicks.

CONCACAF W Championship

*Draws include knockout matches decided on penalty kicks.

References

External links
Official website
FIFA Profile

Caribbean women's national association football teams